The 2018 Uzbekistan Super League (known as the Pepsi Uzbekistan Super League for sponsorship reasons) was the 27th season of top level football in Uzbekistan since 1992. Lokomotiv Tashkent were the defending champions from the 2017 campaign.

Teams

On 21 November 2017 according to UzPFL management decision the Uzbek League was officially renamed to Uzbekistan Super League starting from 2018 season. The number of teams playing in top division of Uzbek football is reduced from 16 to 12.

The draw for the 2018 Super League season was held on 3 February 2018. The first matchday is scheduled for 1 March 2018.

Sementchi, the winner of 2017 Uzbekistan First League did not participate in new Super League season. The club failed to pass licensing procedures like Mash'al Mubarek. These both clubs have been replaced by Neftchi Fergana and Sogdiana Jizzakh which according to 2017 season have been relegated to First League.

Managerial changes

Foreign players

The number of foreign players is restricted to five per USL team. A team can use only five foreign players on the field in each game.

In bold: Players that have been capped for their national team.

Regular stage

Championship round
Teams keep records from regular stage (10 matches) against championship round opponents.

Relegation round
Teams keep records from regular stage (10 matches) against relegation round opponents.

Relegation play-off

Sogdiana and AGMK will play in 2019 Uzbekistan Super League next season.

Season statistics

Top scorers
.

References

Uzbekistan Super League seasons